James Gray was an American Negro league third baseman in the 1920s.

Gray played for the Nashville Elite Giants in 1929. In three recorded games, he posted one hit in eight plate appearances.

References

External links
Baseball statistics and player information from Baseball-Reference Black Baseball Stats and Seamheads

Year of birth missing
Year of death missing
Place of birth missing
Place of death missing
Nashville Elite Giants players